is a Japanese ska punk band from Kitakyūshū, Fukuoka Prefecture.

Debuting in 2001, 175R has released seven singles, seven albums and four DVDs. The band's members include Shogo on Vocals, Kazya on guitar, Isakick on bass and Yoshiaki on drums.  The band shared their second single with the band Shaka Labbits. The name 175R means "Inago Rider," which is derived from the goroawase of "175" plus "R" for "rider." Inago (蝗) means grasshopper in Japanese, as a reference to the popular Kamen Rider Series of tokusatsu television programs. In 2007, the group's single "Yume de Aeta Nara..." was featured as the ending theme for the film Kamen Rider Den-O: I'm Born!. 

Another one of their songs, Melody, was used featured in a music-related video game for the Nintendo DS called Osu! Tatakae! Ouendan. Unlike the other songs included in the game, Ouendan made use of an actual (albeit edited) 175R recording, instead of a cover version.

Discography
Albums
 Go! Upstart! (February 6, 2002)
 Songs (June 18, 2003)
 Melody (September 1, 2004)
 7 -Seven- (February 22, 2006)
 Bremen (April 25, 2007)
 Omae wa Sugee! (April 9, 2008)
 Japon (February, 03, 2010)

Singles
 "From North Nine States" (June 2001)
 "Stand By You!!" (July 2002, split single with Shaka Labbits)
 
 
 
 "Glory Days" (March 3, 2004)
 
 "Orange" (November 17, 2004) (with Kick the Can Crew)
 
 
 
 
 
 
 
 

Home video
 Live! LiveE! Life? (December 2003)
 Clips+ (January 2004)
 Live! Live! Life? (December 2003) - Video, only 5000 prints.
 Live at Budokan '04 (December 2004)

External links
 Official Website by BugBox
 Website by Toshiba EMI 
 175R file at JaME 
 175r @ J-Music Italia 
 175r @ HearJapan

References

Japanese punk rock groups
Japanese ska groups
Musical groups from Fukuoka Prefecture